The Jose P. Laurel Polytechnic College, or simply JPLPC, is a satellite campus of Batangas State University. It is located in Malvar, Batangas, Philippines. It is one of the two satellite campuses of Batangas State University, the other being Apolinario R. Apacible School of Fisheries.

Formerly Jose P. Laurel, Sr. Memorial School of Arts and Trades, it was established on 15 June 1968 by the virtue of Republic Act No. 5417. Many years later on 21 May 1992, the school was elevated into a college and renamed Jose P. Laurel Polytechnic College through the Republic Act No. 7518. As authorized by Republic Act No. 9045, it was eventually integrated to Batangas State University as its satellite campus on 22 March 2001.

Note

References

External links 
 Official Website of Batangas State University
 Online Services of Batangas State University

Batangas State University
Universities and colleges in Batangas
State universities and colleges in the Philippines
Schools in Batangas